Castets-en-Dorthe (Gascon: Castèths Andòrta) is a former commune in the Gironde department in Nouvelle-Aquitaine in southwestern France. On 1 January 2017, it was merged into the new commune Castets et Castillon.

The village lies at the junction of the Canal de Garonne with the river Garonne.

Population

See also
Communes of the Gironde department

References

External links

Official site 

Former communes of Gironde